Lake As Pontes is an artificial lake in the municipality of As Pontes, Galicia (Spain).

The site of the lake is a former Lignite mine operated by Spanish energy company Endesa. Once filled it will be the largest lake in Spain.

See also
 List of dams and reservoirs in Spain

Pontes